Robert Dean Hantla (October 3, 1931 – November 10, 2020) was an American football offensive guard who played two seasons with the San Francisco 49ers of the National Football League (NFL). He was drafted by the 49ers in the fifth round of the 1954 NFL Draft. He played college football at the University of Kansas and attended Meade High School in Meade, Kansas. Hantla was also a member of the BC Lions and Winnipeg Blue Bombers. His son Jeff Hantla went on to play for the Arizona Wildcats.

College career
Hantla lettered for the Kansas Jayhawks from 1951 to 1953, earning First-team All-Big Seven Conference honors in 1952.

Professional career
Hantla was selected by the San Francisco 49ers of the NFL  with the 55th pick in the 1954 NFL Draft. He played in 24 games for the 49ers from 1954 to 1955. He played in sixteen games for the BC Lions of the Western Interprovincial Football Union from 1956 to 1957. Hantla played for the Winnipeg Blue Bombers of the Canadian Football League in 1959.

He died on November 10, 2020, in Chandler, Arizona at age 89.

References

External links
Just Sports Stats

1931 births
2020 deaths
Players of American football from Kansas
American football offensive guards
American football linebackers
Canadian football guards
Canadian football defensive linemen
Canadian football linebackers
American players of Canadian football
Kansas Jayhawks football players
San Francisco 49ers players
BC Lions players
Winnipeg Blue Bombers players
People from St. John, Kansas